Purple Belt may refer to the following:
Purple belt, a rank in martial arts (see Kyū)
Purple belt (Brazilian Jiu-Jitsu), a level in the Brazilian jiu-jitsu ranking system
A road in the Allegheny County belt system.